Głubczyce-Las  is a village in the administrative district of Gmina Głubczyce, within Głubczyce County, Opole Voivodeship, in south-western Poland.

The village has a few lone houses and a railway station (built in 1976)

References

2. https://fbc.pionier.net.pl/details/nnmcvzb

Villages in Głubczyce County